Clan Houston is a Scottish clan. The clan did not have a chief therefore it was considered an Armigerous clan.

History

Origins of the clan
The name is territorial in origin, derived from an old barony of the name in Lanarkshire. Hugh de Padinan, who is believed to have lived in the twelfth century, was granted the lands of Kilpeter. By about the middle of the fourteenth century, these lands had become known as Huston, or Houston, Renfrewshire. Sir Finlay de Hustone appears on the Ragman Roll swearing fealty to King Edward I of England in 1296.

The castle of the de Hustones was built on the site of an ancient Cistercian abbey. The family also acquired a substantial barony near Whitburn, West Lothian, where Huston House, which was rebuilt in the eighteenth century, still stands today. Sir Patrick Hustone of that Ilk, who was probably the eleventh chief, married Agnes Campbell of Ardkinglas.

Sixteenth and seventeenth centuries
During the Anglo-Scottish Wars, Sir Peter Huston fought with the Earl of Lennox on the right wing at Battle of Flodden in 1513, where he was killed.

His son, Sir Patrick Huston of Huston, was a companion of James V of Scotland and Keeper of the Quarter Seal. He intrigued with Lord Lennox against the king, and was slain at the Battle of Linlithgow.

The next Sir Patrick, his grandson, was knighted by Mary, Queen of Scots, and accompanied her when she visited Lord Darnley in Glasgow.

The nineteenth chief was created a Baronet of Nova Scotia by Charles II in 1668. His son, Sir John, was falconer to Queen Mary and her husband, King William of Orange.

Eighteenth and nineteenth centuries
The fifth Baronet was a prosperous merchant who had substantial interests in United States.  His son, who was educated in Glasgow, made his home in the southern state of Georgia in the US, and he and his brother greatly increased the family’s colonial estates.  They are reputed to have owned over eight thousand slaves when the thirteen American colonies broke from Great Britain and declared their independence.  The Hustons renounced their Scottish titles in favour of their American wealth. General Sam Houston, born in Rockbridge, VA, 1793, was a schoolteacher in Maryville Tennessee, US Senator from the State of Tennessee, ran for President of the United States, fought for the independence of Texas from Mexico, defeating Santa Ana and started the Texas Rangers.  He was the first president of the Republic of Texas and later served as Governor of the State of Texas.  Sir Robert Houston, descended from a Renfrew branch of the family, was a prominent Victorian ship owner who was created a baronet of the United Kingdom.  He is credited with developing the theory of convoys first used during the Boer War.

Twentieth century
A living member of the clan, Josh Houston, has taken up the case with the Court of the Lord Lyon to be instated as the Chief of the Houston Clan.   The Court has yet to reach a decision.

Motto
Motto: In Tempus ("In Time").

See also
 Houston, Renfrewshire
 Scottish Clan

References

External links
Archive of Myclan.com

Houston
Houston